Hägendorf railway station is a railway station in the municipality of Hägendorf, in the Swiss canton of Solothurn. It is an intermediate stop on the standard gauge Jura Foot line of Swiss Federal Railways.

Services
 the following services stop at Hägendorf:

References

External links 
 
 

Railway stations in the canton of Solothurn
Swiss Federal Railways stations